Thomas Wilson (1869 – 13 November 1918) was a New Zealand cricketer. He played one first-class match for Auckland in 1891/92.

See also
 List of Auckland representative cricketers

References

External links
 

1869 births
1918 deaths
New Zealand cricketers
Auckland cricketers